Cusden is a surname. Notable people with the surname include:

Phoebe Cusden (1887–1981), British trade unionist, educator, peace campaigner, and politician
Simon Cusden (born 1985), British cricketer

See also
Cussen

English-language surnames